Gaspra (officially transliterated Haspra; ; , from Greek hàspra, άσπρα, white) is a spa town, an urban-type settlement in Yalta Municipality in the Autonomous Republic of Crimea. It is located on the Black Sea coast, west of Yalta, and is a popular holiday resort. Population: 

Leo Tolstoy lived in Gaspra in 1901 and 1902. Nearby are the Swallow's Nest, a modern castle and Charax, Crimea a Roman fort. 

The asteroid 951 Gaspra is named after the town.

Climate
Gaspra has an oceanic climate (Köppen: Cfb).

Notable landmarks
Tourist attractions in the vicinity include the Roman castrum of Charax and the romantic castle of Swallow's Nest.

People from Gaspra
 Ismail Gasprinski, Crimean Tatar intellectual, educator, publisher and politician.

Twin towns — sister cities
  Tirilye, Turkey

References

External links
 

Urban-type settlements in Crimea
Spa towns in Ukraine
Yalta Municipality